Jorge Carlos Hurtado Valdez (born March 22, 1949) is a Mexican politician and former governor of Campeche.  A member of the Institutional Revolutionary Party (PRI), he took office on September 16, 2003.  Previous, he served as Secretary of Public Works and Communication for the state of Campeche from September 16, 1997 to March 29, 2000 and mayor of Campeche from October 1, 2000 until November 6, 2002.

See also
 List of presidents of Campeche Municipality

References

External links
Career, Government of the state of Campeche. Retrieved on August 24, 2006.

1949 births
Governors of Campeche
Living people
Institutional Revolutionary Party politicians
Politicians from Campeche City
Municipal presidents in Campeche
21st-century Mexican politicians